Private Vices, Public Pleasures is a 1976 Italian-Yugoslavian drama film directed by Miklós Jancsó. It was entered into the 1976 Cannes Film Festival.

Cast
 Lajos Balázsovits as Crown Prince Rudolf
 Pamela Villoresi as Sofia
 Franco Branciaroli as Duke
 Teresa Ann Savoy as Mary Vetsera
 Laura Betti as Therese
 Ivica Pajer as General
 Zvonimir Crnko
 Umberto Silva
 Demeter Bitenc
 Susanna Javicoli
 Anikó Sáfár
 Ilona Staller as woman in orgy
 Gloria Piedimonte

References

External links

1976 films
Yugoslav drama films
1970s Italian-language films
1976 drama films
Italian erotic drama films
Films directed by Miklós Jancsó
Rudolf, Crown Prince of Austria
Films scored by Francesco De Masi
Films set in 1889
1970s Italian films